Roman Vladimirovich Rasskazov; born April 28, 1979 in Kovylkino, Mordovia) is a Russian race walker.

International competitions

See also
List of world records in athletics

References

1979 births
Living people
Sportspeople from Mordovia
Russian male racewalkers
Olympic male racewalkers
Olympic athletes of Russia
Athletes (track and field) at the 2000 Summer Olympics
Goodwill Games medalists in athletics
Competitors at the 2001 Goodwill Games
World Athletics Championships athletes for Russia
World Athletics Championships medalists
World Athletics Championships winners
World Athletics U20 Championships winners
Russian Athletics Championships winners
World record holders in athletics (track and field)
World record setters in athletics (track and field)
Goodwill Games gold medalists in athletics